Edward D. Glenn (October 1875 – December 6, 1911) was a shortstop in Major League Baseball.

Glenn died in Ludlow, Kentucky when he accidentally fell into a railroad pit.

External links

1875 births
1911 deaths
Major League Baseball shortstops
Washington Senators (1891–1899) players
New York Giants (NL) players
Chicago Orphans players
Baseball players from Cincinnati
Accidental deaths from falls
Accidental deaths in Kentucky
Railway accident deaths in the United States
19th-century baseball players
Portsmouth Browns players
Lynchburg Hill Climbers players
New Bedford Whalers (baseball) players
New Bedford Browns players
Worcester (minor league baseball) players
New Haven Blues players
Cambridge Orphans players
Lowell Orphans players
Taunton Herrings players
Columbus Senators players
Anderson Anders players
Youngstown Little Giants players
Marion Glass Blowers players
Selma Christians players
Utica Pent-Ups players
Memphis Egyptians players
Natchez Indians players
Bloomington Bloomers players
Augusta Tourists players
Charleston Sea Gulls players
Frankfort Statesmen players
Richmond Pioneers players
Shelbyville Grays players
Lexington Colts players
Shelbyville Rivermen players
Maysville Rivermen players
Cambridge (minor league baseball) players